Xenoschesis is a genus of parasitoid wasps belonging to the family Ichneumonidae.

The species of this genus are found in Europe and Northern America.

Species:
 Xenoschesis aethiops (Gravenhorst, 1829) 
 Xenoschesis cinctiventris (Ashmead, 1896)

References

Ichneumonidae
Ichneumonidae genera